The administration of territory in dynastic China is the history of practices involved in governing the land from the Qin dynasty (221–206 BC) to the Qing dynasty (1636–1912).

Administrative divisions in imperial China

County
The only level at which state officials actually governed the common people was the county level. Counties were coordinated by prefectures which had on average, about ten counties. Overseeing inspectors were sent out from the central government to oversee the work of the prefectures. During the Yuan (1271–1368) and Ming (1368–1644) dynasties, these arrangements were solidified into permanent provinces. Funding for the local administration came from taxes collected while a portion was set aside for the central government.

Counties (xian) originally meant "dependencies" ruled by vassals of royal blood. During the Qin dynasty (221–206 BC), they were coordinated by commanderies (jun) and expanded throughout the entire empire, but the Han (202 BC–220 AD) returned them to indirect rule by vassals. However, after 100 years, the dependencies were gradually converted into counties or incorporated by 100 BC. In practice, most dynasties started out with some combination of the county and dependency dichotomy and trended towards greater centralization through the county/prefectural system over time.

The county was headed by a "court-appointed official" responsible for collecting taxes, hearing trials, public order, education, examinations, morality, and religious customs. Counties in politically important areas were assigned to jinshi degree holders while counties in remote areas were assigned to provincial exam graduates (juren). During the Ming dynasty, the percentage of jinshi degree holding magistrates could range from 71% to 5% depending on their assigned area's importance. In theory, each local magistrate's office (yamen) was divided into six sections corresponding to the Six Ministries. By Qing times, additional sections were also added for taxes, document receipt and distribution, and salt. On average, each Qing county had 20-30 clerks working these sections. They were selected by the magistrate and received a government stipend. Working under the clerks were a variety of subofficials and support personnel. The  also had runners doing menial work. In the late 19th century the total number of people employed by the yamen in a county could range from 200 to over 500.

Village
Below the county were villages and city wards governed by a combination of magistrates, city governments, local families, and local militia. During Qin and Han times, counties were separated into five rural villages or townships (xiang). Below rural districts were villages (li) that contained squads (wu). Emperor Gaozu of Han). Later dynasties had security institutions composed of several households such as the baojia system.

Provincial administration
Regional governments were introduced by the Qin dynasty after it destroyed the last independent hereditary kingdoms. The Qin empire was divided into commanderies (jun), each of which was led by three officials. The Han dynasty identified the rapid concentration of central power as one of the reasons for the Qin downfall and therefore only adopted the commandery/prefectural system for half its territory and installed hereditary kingdoms in the other half. They were gradually brought under Han control and as a result, there were 103 commanderies by the end of Eastern Han (25–220). Thirteen regional inspectorates (cishi) were established over them. Most of them were named after the Nine Regions and were thus called zhou (province). These provinces, circuits, or inspectorates did not function as provincial governorships. Both the Tang and Song saw these regions as broad areas for Commissioners to coordinate government activity. Each circuit (dao or lu) was assigned four Commissions, each tasked with a different administrative activity: military, fiscal, judicial, and supply.

Permanent provincial administrations developed under the Yuan and Ming dynasties. The Yuan province, called a Branch Secretariat (xing zhongshu sheng), was governed by two Managers of Governmental Affairs (pingchang zhengshi). Sometimes a Grand Chancellor (chengxiang) was in charge of an entire province. It's uncertain how much central authority the government had over these provinces since they were essentially ruled by Mongol nobles. Between the provinces and the central government were two agencies: the Branch Bureau of Military Affairs (xing shumi yuan) and the Branch Censorate (xing yushi tai). The Ming provincial government consisted of three cooperating agencies: the Provincial Administration Commission (chengxuan buzheng shisi), the Provincial Surveillance Commission (tixing ancha shisi), and the Regional Military Commission (du zhihui shisi). They were directed by a Grand Coordinator, whose tenure was indefinite, and a Supreme Commander. Executive officials of the Three Provincial Commissions were called Regional Overseers. The Qing dynasty expanded the number of provinces to 18 by 1850 and did away with the tripartite provincial administration. Qing provinces were governed by a single Governor (xunfu) who answered to a Governors-general (zongdu).

Metropolitan
The metropolitan area, the capital and its hinterlands, was directly subordinate to the central court and often named as such. During the Yuan dynasty, Khanbaliq and its surroundings were named fuli (lit. abdomen). The Ming court called Nanjing Yingtian fu (lit. responsive to heaven prefecture) and the surrounding area Zhili (lit. directly attached) from 1378 to 1403. After 1403, Beiping and its surrounding region was called Bei zhili (northern zhili), and when it became the capital in 1423, Nanjing's metropolitan area was called Nan zhili (southern zhili). Shuntian and Yingtian prefectures were referred to as Jingfu (capital prefectures). During the Qing dynasty, the Shuntian prefect was allowed to directly memorialize the emperor, but the subprefectures and counties were jointly governed with the governor of Zhili. The capital usually had a higher concentration of military personnel. The Qing settled them just outside Beijing with their own farmland and the parks to the north were also strewn with Banner villages.

Table of administrative divisions

Qin dynasty (221–206 BC)

After the state of Qin conquered China in 221 BC, the "First Emperor of Qin", Qin Shi Huang, divided the Qin dynasty into 36, and then ultimately, 40 commanderies, which were divided into counties, which were further divided into townships (xiang). The imperial capital was excluded from the normal administrative units and was administered by a Chamberlain (neishi). Administrative control of a commandery was divided between a Governor (shou), who handled general administration, and a Defender (wei), who supervised military garrisons. Counties were administered by a Magistrate (ling). Control of a township was divided between an Elder (sanlao), the moral authority, a Husbander (sefu), who handled fiscal affairs, and a Patroller (youjiao), who kept the local peace. Below townships were even smaller divisions of a thousand households, which constituted a neighborhood (ting), and a hundred households, which constituted a village (li).

There was no formal system of recruitment for personnel during Qin times. All appointments down to the county level were based on recommendation and decided by the Grand Chancellor and emperor. Tenures were indefinite. Officials could obtain titles graded from 20 to 1 for meritorious service, but such titles were not hereditary, and did not confer a fief to the holder.

Han dynasty (202 BC–220 AD)

The founder of the Han dynasty, Emperor Gaozu of Han (r. 28 February 202  – 1 June 195 BC), separated the dynasty's territory between the western half directly controlled by the imperial capital, and the eastern half, ruled by Kings of the Han dynasty. In the areas controlled by the central government, regional hierarchy followed the Qin model of commandery and county. The eastern nobility ruled kingdoms (wangguo) or marquisates (houguo) that were largely autonomous until 154 BC when a series of imperial actions gradually brought them under central control. By the end of the millennium they differed from commanderies and counties only in name and were controlled by a Counselor-delegate (guoxiang) appointed by the central government.

Until 106 BC, the central government supervised the commanderies through touring Censors, but in that year, Emperor Wu of Han formally divided the commanderies into 13 provinces. These provinces were governed by Regional Inspectors (cishi) or Regional Governors (zhoumu). Regional Inspectors and Governors were not allowed to serve in their native commandery.

After 104 BC, the imperial capital was governed by the Three Guardians (sanfu): Metropolitan Governor (jingzhaoyin), Guardian of the Left (zuopingyi), and Guardian of the Right (youpingyi). After 89 BC, these three positions were subordinated by the Military Commandant (sili xiaowei) who reported directly to the emperor.

Recruitment
Han officialdom was ruled by an aristocracy down to the county level. Candidates for offices recommended by the provinces were examined by the Ministry of Rites and then presented to the emperor. Some candidates for clerical positions would be given a test to determine whether they could memorize nine thousand Chinese characters. The tests administered during the Han dynasty did not offer formal entry into government posts. Recruitment and appointment in the Han dynasty were primarily through recommendations by aristocrats and local officials. Recommended individuals were also primarily aristocrats. In theory, recommendations were based on a combination of reputation and ability but it's not certain how well this worked in practice. Oral examinations on policy issues were sometimes conducted personally by the emperor himself during Western Han times.

Although executive officials were appointed by the central government, they were allowed to freely appoint their own sons and favored friends. An appointed official first served one year in probationary status and then obtained indefinite tenure with three year intervals, at which point they were assessed by their supervisors for promotion, demotion, or dismissal. During the reign of Emperor Wu (r. 9 March 141 BC – 29 March 87 BC), every commandery and kingdom was called on to nominate one or two men for appointment each year. Later the number of nominations was fixed to one per 200,000 people. From 165 BC onward, nominees were given written examinations to confirm their literacy and learning. In 124 BC, Emperor Wu established the Taixue with a faculty of five Erudites (boshi) and student body of 50, recommended by Commandery Governors, that grew to 3,000 by the end of the millennium. Students studied the classics at the Taixue for one year and then sat a written graduation exam, after which they were either appointed or returned home to seek positions on the commandery staff. Officials were paid on a monthly basis in both grain and coin corresponding to their rank. The number of graduates who went on to hold office were few. The examinations did not offer a formal route to commissioned office and the primary path to office remained through recommendations.

Sui dynasty (581–618)

Sui dynasty administrative divisions were initially the same as the Han, but in 586, Emperor Wen of Sui abolished commanderies and left provinces in direct control of counties. In 605, Emperor Yang of Sui revived the commandery. In the early years of the Sui dynasty, Area Commanders-in-chief (zongguan) ruled as semi-autonomous warlords, but they were gradually replaced with Branch Departments of State Affairs (xing taisheng).

In 587, the Sui dynasty mandated every province to nominate three "cultivated talents" (xiucai) per year for appointment. In 599, all capital officials of rank five and above were required to make nominations for appointment in several categories.

Imperial examinations
Examination categories for "classicists" (mingjing ke) and "cultivated talents" (xiucai ke) were introduced. Classicists were tested on the Confucian canon, which was considered an easy task at the time, so those who passed were awarded posts in the lower rungs of officialdom. Cultivated talents were tested on matters of statecraft as well as the Confucian canon. In AD 607, Emperor Yang established a new category of examinations for the "presented scholar" (jinshi ke ). These three categories of examination were the origins of the imperial examination system that would last until 1905. Consequently, the year 607 is also considered by many to be the real beginning of the imperial examination system. The Sui dynasty was itself short lived however and the system was not developed further until much later.

The imperial examinations did not significantly shift recruitment selection in practice during the Sui dynasty. Schools at the capital still produced students for appointment. Inheritance of official status was also still practiced. Men of the merchant and artisan classes were still barred from officialdom. However the reign of Emperor Wen (r. 4 March 581 – 13 August 604) did see much greater expansion of government authority over officials. Under Emperor Wen, all officials down to the county level had to be appointed by the Department of State Affairs in the capital and were subjected to annual merit rating evaluations. Regional Inspectors and County Magistrates had to be transferred every three years and their subordinates every four years. They were not allowed to bring their parents or adult children with them upon reassignment of territorial administration. The Sui did not establish any hereditary kingdoms or marquisates of the Han sort. To compensate, nobles were given substantial stipends and staff. Aristocratic officials were ranked based on their pedigree with distinctions such as "high expectations", "pure", and "impure" so that they could be awarded offices appropriately.

Tang dynasty (618–907)

The Tang dynasty was divided into circuits, which were divided into prefectures, which were further divided into counties. There were three Superior Prefectures known as Jingzhao, in the Chang'an area, Henan, in the Luoyang area, and Taiyuan, in modern Shanxi Province. Each Superior Prefecture was nominally administered by an Imperial Prince but usually another official was actually in charge. A normal prefecture was administered by a Prefect. Sometimes a prefecture could be designated an Area Command (dudu fu) under an Area Commander (dudu) and a few prefectures could be grouped together into a Superior Area Command (da dudu fu) under a Commander-in-chief (da dudu). Area Commanders were later replaced by Defense Commands (zhen) under Military Commissioners (jiedushi). The circuit was assigned a Surveillance Commissioner (ancha shi), who functioned as an overall coordinator rather than a governor, and visited prefectures and checked up on the performance of officials. After the An Lushan Rebellion (16 December 755 – 17 February 763), the role of the Surveillance Commissioner shifted to that of a more direct civil governor while many Military Commissioners became autonomous warlords in all but name. Sometimes borderlands were designated a Protectorate (duhu fu) under a Protector (duhu).

Expansion of the imperial examinations
During the Tang dynasty, candidates were either recommended by their schools or had to register for exams at their home prefecture. In 693, Wu Zetian expanded the examination system by allowing commoners and gentry previously disqualified by their non-elite backgrounds to take the tests.

Six categories of regular civil-service examinations were organized by the Department of State Affairs and held by the Ministry of Rites: cultivated talents, classicists, presented scholars, legal experts, writing experts, and arithmetic experts. Emperor Xuanzong of Tang also added categories for Daoism and apprentices. The hardest of these examination categories, the presented scholar jinshi degree, became more prominent over time until it superseded all other examinations. By the late Tang the jinshi degree became a prerequisite for appointment into higher offices. Appointments by recommendation were also required to take examinations. However candidates who passed the exams were not automatically granted office. They still had to pass a quality evaluation by the Ministry of Rites, after which they were allowed to wear official robes.

Successful candidates reported to the Ministry of Personnel for placement examinations. Unassigned officials and honorary title holders were expected to take placement examinations at regular intervals. Non-assigned status could last a very long time especially when waiting for a substantive appointment. After being assigned to office, a junior official was given an annual merit rating. There was no specified term limit, but most junior officials served for at least three years or more in one post. Senior officials served indefinitely at the pleasure of the emperor.

The Tang emperors placed the palace exam graduates, the jinshi, in important government posts, where they came into conflict with hereditary elites. During the reign of Emperor Xuanzong of Tang (713-56), about a third of the Grand Chancellors appointed were jinshi, but by the time of Emperor Xianzong of Tang (806-21), three fifths of the Grand Chancellors appointed were jinshi. This change in the way government was organized dealt a real blow to the aristocrats, but they did not sit idly by and wait to become obsolete. Instead they themselves entered the examinations to gain the privileges associated with it. By the end of the dynasty, the aristocratic class had produced 116 jinshi, so that they remained a significant influence in the government. Hereditary privileges were also not completely done away with. The sons of high ministers and great generals had the right to hold minor offices without taking the examinations. In addition, the number of graduates were not only small, but also formed their own clique in the government based around the examiners and the men they passed. In effect the graduates became another interest group the emperor had to contend with.

Liao dynasty (916–1125)

The Khitan-led Liao dynasty was divided between a nomadic tribal Northern Administration and a sedentary Chinese Southern Establishment. They were each headed by a Prime Minister, the northern one appointed by the Xiao consort clan, and the southern one appointed by the ruling Yelü clan. The Southern Establishments were divided into five "circuits", each with a capital city. Each circuit except for the one dominated by the Supreme Capital (shangjing) was ruled by a Regent (liushou). Under the Regent were Governors (yin''') of prefectures who ruled below them Magistrates of counties. Under the Northern Administration, Khitans were organized around an ordo, the moving camp of a chief. Throughout the duration of the Liao dynasty, the number of ordos fluctuated between 10 and 44. The tribal vassals of the Liao were organized into territories known as routes (lu) headed by a tribal chief.

Imperial examinations were only held for the Southern Establishments until the last decade of the dynasty when Khitans found it an acceptable avenue for advancing their careers. The examinations focused primarily on lyric-meter poetry and rhapsodies. Recruitment through examinations was irregular and all offices of note were hereditary in nature and held by Khitans.

Song dynasty (960–1279)

The Song dynasty kept the circuit, prefecture, county hierarchy. The Military Prefecture was called an "army" (jun) and a handful of prefectures containing mines and salterns were designated Industrial Prefectures (jian). The prefectures were nominally administered by a Prefect, but in practice the central government appointed another Manager of the Affairs to administer groups of prefectures. Actions by Prefects also had to be signed off by a prefectural supervisor. Like the Tang before them, the Song used circuits not as provincial governorships but regions for Commissioners to coordinate government activity. Four Commissions were assigned to every circuit, each tasked with a different administrative activity: military, fiscal, judicial, and supply.

Scholar bureaucracy
The imperial examinations became the primary method of recruitment for official posts. More than a hundred palace examinations were held during the dynasty, resulting in a greater number of jinshi degrees rewarded. The examinations were opened to adult Chinese males, with some restrictions, including even individuals from the occupied northern territories of the Liao and Jin dynasties. Many individuals of low social status were able to rise to political prominence through success in the imperial examination. The process of studying for the examination tended to be time-consuming and costly, requiring time to spare and tutors. Most of the candidates came from the numerically small but relatively wealthy land-owning scholar-official class.

Successful candidates were appointed to office almost immediately and waiting periods between appointments were not long. Annual merit ratings were taken and officials could request evaluation for reassignment. Officials who wished to escape harsh assignments often requested reassignment as a state supervisor of a Taoist temple or monastery. Senior officials in the capital also sometimes nominated themselves for the position of Prefect in obscure prefectures.

Hereditary prefectures
When Emperor Taizu of Song expanded southwest he encountered four powerful families: the Yang of Bozhou, the Song of Manzhou, the Tian of Sizhou, and the Long of Nanning. Long Yanyao, patriarch of the Long family, submitted to Song rule in 967 with the guarantee that he could rule Nanning as his personal property, to be passed down through his family without Song interference. In return the Long family was required to present tribute to the Song court. The other families were also offered the same conditions, which they accepted. Although they were included among the official prefectures of the Song dynasty, in practice, these families and their estates constituted independent hereditary kingdoms within the Song realm.

In 975, Emperor Taizong of Song ordered Song Jingyang and Long Hantang to attack the Mu'ege kingdom and drive them back across the Yachi River. Whatever territory they seized they were allowed to keep. After a year of fighting, they succeeded in the endeavor.

Jin dynasty (1115–1234)

The Jurchen-led Jin dynasty was divided into 19 routes, five of which were governed from capitals under the control of Regents. The 14 routes not controlled by capitals were under the administration of Area Commands (zongguanfu). Under the routes were prefectures. The Jurchens adopted a more Chinese administration than the Khitans. They instituted an examination system in 1123 and adopted the triennial examination cycle in 1129. Two separate examinations were held to accommodate their former Liao and Song subjects. In the north, examinations focused on lyric-meter poetry and rhapsodies while in the south, Confucian Classics were tested. During the reign of Emperor Xizong of Jin (r. 1135–1150), the contents of both examinations were unified and examinees were tested on both genres. Emperor Zhangzong of Jin (r. 1189–1208) abolished the prefectural examinations. Emperor Shizong of Jin (r. 1161–1189) created the first examination conducted in the Jurchen language, with a focus on political writings and poetry. Graduates of the Jurchen examination were called "treatise graduates" (celun jinshi) to distinguish them from the regular Chinese jinshi.

Posts were regularly filled by examination graduates and it was not uncommon for one in three candidates to pass. An average of 200 Metropolitan Graduate Degrees were handed out per year. Although Chinese subjects were able to obtain offices through the examinations, a regional quota assured that northerners (principally Jurchens) passed more consistently and were more quickly promoted upon obtaining office. Often Jurchen examinees had to demonstrate little more than literacy to pass. Chinese officials also faced discrimination, at times physical, while Jurchens retained all final decision-making powers within the Jin government.

Yuan dynasty (1271–1368)

Under the Mongol-led Yuan dynasty, the largest administrative division was the province, also known as a Branch Secretariat (xing zhongshu sheng). A province was governed by two Managers of Governmental Affairs. Occasionally a Grand Chancellor was put in charge of an entire province. It's questionable how much authority the central government had over the provinces as they were essentially the administrative bases of Mongol nobles. Between the provinces and the central government were two agencies: the Branch Bureau of Military Affairs (xing shumi yuan) and the Branch Censorate (xing yushi tai). The Military Branch handled military affairs and had jurisdiction over vaguely defined territories known as Regions. There were three Branch Censorates that handled overseeing the provincial affairs of the Yuan dynasty.

Below the provinces were circuits with agencies headed by Commissioners who coordinated matters between the provincial level authorities and lower-level routes, prefectures, and districts. The route was governed by an Overseer and a Commander. Below routes were prefectures headed by an Overseer and a Prefect. At the lowest level, below the prefectures, were counties headed by an Overseer and a Magistrate. The capital Khanbaliq was governed by the Dadu Route under the administration of two Police Commissions, while the summer capital Shangdu was under another Police Commission.

All residents of the Yuan dynasty were grouped into four categories: Mongols, Semu-ren, Han-ren, and Manzi. Semu-ren were subjects of the Yuan dynasty west of China, Han-ren were the former subjects of the Jin dynasty, and the Manzi were all former subjects of the Song dynasty. All important government positions were held by Mongols and Semu-ren with some minor offices held by Han-ren, while Manzi were relegated to local offices in their own area. Mongol Overseers were assigned to every office down to the county level.

Imperial examinations were ceased for a time with the defeat of the Song in 1279 by Kublai Khan. One of Kublai's main advisers, Liu Bingzhong, recommended restoring the examination system, however Kublai distrusted the examinations and did not heed his advice. Kublai believed that Confucian learning was not needed for government posts and was opposed to such a commitment to the Chinese language and to the Chinese scholars who were so adept at it, as well as its accompanying ideology. He wished to appoint his own people without relying on an apparatus inherited from a newly conquered and sometimes rebellious country.Wendy, Frey. History Alive!: The Medieval World and beyond. Palo Alto, CA: Teacher's Curriculum Institute, 2005.

The examination system was revived in 1315 with significant changes during the reign of Ayurbarwada Buyantu Khan. The new examination system organized its examinees into regional categories in a way which favored Mongols and severely disadvantaged the Manzi. A quota system both for number of candidates and degrees awarded was instituted based on the classification of the four groups, those being the Mongols, (Semu-ren), Han-ren, and Manzi, with further restrictions by province favoring the northeast of the empire (Mongolia) and its vicinities. A quota of 300 persons was fixed for provincial examinations with 75 persons from each group. The metropolitan exam had a quota of 100 persons with 25 persons from each group. Candidates were enrolled on two lists with the Mongols and Semu-ren located on the left and the Han-ren and Manzi on the right. Examinations were written in Chinese and based on Confucian and Neo-Confucian texts but the Mongols and Semu-ren received easier questions to answer than the Chinese. Successful candidates were awarded one of three ranks. All graduates were eligible for official appointment.

Under the revised system the yearly averages for examination degrees awarded was about 21. The way in which the four regional categories were divided tended to favor the Mongols, Semu-ren, and Han-ren, despite the Manzi being by far the largest portion of the population. The 1290 census figures record some 12,000,000 households (about 48% of the total Yuan population) for South China, versus 2,000,000 North Chinese households, and the populations of Mongols and Semu-ren were both less. While South China was technically allotted 75 candidates for each provincial exam, only 28 Han Chinese from South China were included among the 300 candidates, the rest of the South China slots (47) being occupied by resident Mongols or Semu-ren, although 47 "racial South Chinese" who were not residents of South China were approved as candidates.

Recruitment by examination during the Yuan dynasty constituted a very minor part of the Yuan administration. Hereditary Mongol nobility formed the elite nucleus of the government. Initially the Mongols drew administrators from their subjects but in 1261, attempts were made by Kublai to increase Mongol personnel by ordering the establishment of Mongolian schools to draw officials from. The School for the Sons of the State was established in 1271 to give two or three years of training for the sons of Imperial Bodyguards so that they might become suitable for official recruitment. Officials serving in the capital were nominally supposed to receive merit ratings every 30 months, for demotion or promotion, but in practice government posts were inherited from father to son.

 Tusi 
Southwestern tribal chieftainships were organized under the tusi system. The  system was inspired by the Jimi system implemented in regions of ethnic minorities groups during the Tang dynasty. It was established as a specific political term during the Yuan dynasty and was used as a political institution to administer newly acquired territories following their conquest of the Dali Kingdom in 1253.

Members of the former Duan imperial clan were appointed as governors-general with nominal authority using the title "Dali chief steward" (p Dàlǐ Zǒngguǎn), and local leaders were co-opted under a variety of titles as administrators of the region. Some credit the Turkoman governor Sayyid Ajjal Shams al-Din Omar with introducing the system into China.  Duan Xingzhi, the last king of Dali, was appointed as the first local ruler, and he accepted the stationing of a pacification commissioner there. Duan Xingzhi offered the Yuan maps of Yunnan and led a considerable army to serve as guides for the Yuan army. By the end of 1256, Yunnan was considered to have been pacified.

Under the Yuan dynasty, the native officials, or tusi, were the clients of a patron-client relationship. The patron, the Yuan emperors, exercised jurisdictional control over the client, but not his/her territory itself.

The tusi chieftains in Yunnan, Guizhou and Sichuan who submitted to Yuan rule and were allowed to keep their titles. The Han Chinese Yang family ruling the Chiefdom of Bozhou which was recognized by the Song and Tang dynasties also received recognition by the subsequent Yuan and Ming dynasties. The Luo clan in Shuixi led by Ahua were recognized by the Yuan emperors, as they were by the Song emperors when led by Pugui and Tang emperors when led by Apei. They descended from the Shu Han era king Huoji who helped Zhuge Liang against Meng Huo. They were also recognized by the Ming dynasty.

Ming dynasty (1368–1644)

The lowest administrative unit during the Ming dynasty was the county which was supervised by a prefecture through a subprefecture. Prefectures were organized into provinces and administered by three cooperating agencies: the Provincial Administration Commission, the Provincial Surveillance Commission, and the Regional Military Commission. The three agencies were directed by a Grand Coordinator and Supreme Commander. The post of Grand Coordinator was indefinite and could last as long as 10 or even 20 years. A Supreme Commander handled military affairs. Neither posts were governorships and were considered special-purpose representatives of the government. The Provincial Administration Commission was in general charge of all civil matters, especially fiscal matters. The Provincial Administration kept three to eight branch offices in each province. Each branch office was headed by an Intendant (daotai) to exercise administrative authority. Each province also had a Tax Intendant. The Provincial Surveillance Commission was headed by a single Surveillance Commissioner, under whom were various vice and assistant commissioners who held censorial and judicial powers. Regional Military Commissioners were responsible for military garrisons in the provinces. Executive officials of the Three Provincial Commissions were collectively known as Regional Overseers. The purpose of this tripartite administration of provinces was so that no one had supreme power in one region.

Recruitment by examination flourished after 1384 in the Ming dynasty. Provincial graduates were sometimes appointed to low-ranking offices or entered the Guozijian for further training, after which they might be considered for better appointments. Before appointment to office, metropolitan graduates were assigned to observe the functions of an office for up to one year. The maximum tenure for an office was nine years, but triennial evaluations were also taken, at which point an official could be reassigned. Magistrates of counties submitted monthly evaluation reports to their prefects and the prefects submitted annual evaluations to provincial authorities. Every third year, provincial authorities submitted evaluations to the central government, at which point an "outer evaluation" was conducted, requiring local administration to send representatives to attend a grand audience at the capital. Officials at the capital conducted an evaluation every six years. Capital officials of rank 4 and above were exempted from regular evaluations. Irregular evaluations were conducted by censorial officials.

Gaitu guiliu
The Ming dynasty continued the Yuan  chiefdom system. The Ming  were categorized into civil and military ranks. The civilian  were given the titles of Tu Zhifu ("native prefecture"), Tu Zhizhou ("native department") and Tu Zhixian ("native county") according to the size and population of their domains. Nominally, they had the same rank as their counterparts in the regular administration system The central government gave more autonomy to those military tusi who controlled areas with fewer Han Chinese people and had underdeveloped infrastructure. They pledged loyalty to the Ming emperor but had almost unfettered power within their domains.  

All the native chieftains were nominally subordinate to Pacification Commissioners (Xuanfushi, Xuanweishi, Anfushi). The Pacification Commissioners were also native chieftains who received their title from the Ming court. As a way of checking their power, Pacification Commissioners were put under the supervision of the Ministry of War.

Throughout its 276-year history, the Ming dynasty bestowed a total of 1608  titles, 960 of which were military-rank and 648 were civilian-rank, the majority of which were in Yunnan, Guizhou and Sichuan. In Tibet, Qinghai and Sichuan, the Ming court sometimes gave both  titles and religious titles to leaders. As a result, those tusi had double identities. They played both the role of political leaders and religious leaders within their domains. For example, during the reign of the Yongle Emperor, the leader of the Jinchuan monastery assisted the Ming army in a battle against the Mongols. The leader was later given the title Yanhua Chanshi (演化禅师), or "Evolved Chan Master", and the power to rule 15 villages as his domain as a reward.

Under Ming administration, the jurisdictional authority of tusi began to be replaced with state territorial authority. The  acted as stop gaps until enough Chinese settlers arrived for a "tipping point" to be reached, and they were then converted into official prefectures and counties to be fully annexed into the central bureaucratic system of the Ming dynasty. This process was known as gaitu guiliu, or "turning native rule into regular administration". The most notable example of this was the consolidation of southwestern  chiefdoms into the province of Guizhou in 1413.

In sum, gaitu guiliu was the process of replacing tusi with state-appointed officials, the transition from jurisdictional sovereignty to territorial sovereignty, and the start of formal empire rather than informal.

Qing dynasty (1636–1912)

The Qing dynasty kept the Ming province system and expanded it to 18 provinces by 1850. However unlike the Ming tripartite provincial administration, Qing provinces were governed by a single Governor (xunfu) who held substantial power. Although all provincial agencies communicated with the central government through him, he himself was subordinate to a Governors-general. While nominally superior to a Governor, usually the Governors-general cooperated closely with the Governor and acted jointly in reporting to the central government. Governors and Governors-generals did not have to have a Manchu-Han Chinese balance, unlike in the central government.

Subordinate to Governors were two kinds of agencies: Provincial Administration Commissions and Provincial Surveillance Commissions. The Provincial Administration Commissioner was a lieutenant-general who bore fiscal responsibilities. The Provincial Surveillance Commissioner was responsible for the administration of judicial and censorial matters. There was also an unofficial Provincial Education Commissioner in every province who supervised schools and certified candidates for the civil service examinations. Under the provincial administration were Circuit Intendants who served as intermediaries between prefectures and provincial administration.

Lifan Yuan
Peripheral territories such as Mongolia, Xinjiang, and Tibet were supervised by the Lifan Yuan (Court of Colonial Affairs). The people living in these areas were generally able to keep their own way of life so long as they kept the peace and showed deference to the Qing emperor. Many of the Mongols were organized into Manchu-style banners or leagues and it was not until the 19th century that Mongolia was brought under tighter control under a Manchu general or Grand Minister Consultant and several Judicial Administrators. The people of Xinjiang were treated as tributary vassals and their leaders used Chinese titles. Tibet's religious leaders were relatively autonomous and treated as tributary princes until the 1720s when rebelliousness prompted the Qing government to place the area under the administration of two Grand Minister Residents, who were supported by Qing military garrisons.

Citations

References
 

 

 Kracke, E. A., Jr. (1967 [1957]). "Region, Family, and Individual in the Chinese Examination System", in Chinese Thoughts & Institutions, John K. Fairbank, editor. Chicago and London: University of Chicago Press.
 

 Yu, Pauline (2002). "Chinese Poetry and Its Institutions", in Hsiang Lectures on Chinese Poetry, Volume 2'', Grace S. Fong, editor. (Montreal: Center for East Asian Research, McGill University).
 

Chinese culture
Civil services
Confucian education
Examinations
Government recruitment
History of Imperial China
Public administration